Pierre Aubé (born 23 February 1944, Normandy) is a French medieval specialist and the author of a number of books. He was a professor at Rouen. He was married to organist and composer Odile Pierre.

Works
1981: Baudouin IV de Jérusalem. Le roi lépreux.
1983: Les Empires normands d’Orient, XIe-XIIIe siècles.
1985: Godefroy de Bouillon, Fayard.
1988: Thomas Becket, Fayard.
1999: Jérusalem 1099, Actes Sud.
2001: Roger II de Sicile. Un Normand en Méditerranée, Payot.
2001: Éloge du mouton, Actes Sud.
2003: Saint Bernard de Clairvaux, Fayard.
2007: Un croisé contre Saladin. Renaud de Châtillon, Fayard.

In collaboration : 
1996: Atlas de l’histoire de France, sous la direction de René Rémond, Perrin.
2000: Jérusalem. Le sacré et le politique, sous la direction d’Elias Sanbar et Farouk Mardam-Bey, Actes Sud.

External links
  Biographical note

1944 births
Living people
21st-century French historians
French medievalists
French male non-fiction writers
20th-century French historians